Carrelame is an extremely high potency artificial sweetener of the guanidine class, closely related to lugduname. While Carrelame is roughly 200,000x as sweet as sucrose, lugduname is still somewhat sweeter. It appears safe in pigs.

See also
 Sucrononic acid

Additional reading

References 

Acetic acids
Sugar substitutes
Guanidines